Doug Elniski is a Canadian politician and was a Member of the Legislative Assembly of Alberta representing the constituency of Edmonton-Calder as a Progressive Conservative.

Early life

Elniski was born in Edmonton circa 1961. Prior to being elected, Elniski worked in a variety of fields, including safety management, resource management, construction, adult education, and business consulting. He is the CEO and owner of a residential and land development/rehabilitation company. Elniski is a former volunteer firefighter.

Political career

Elniski's win in Edmonton-Calder represented a gain for the Progressive Conservatives. He won the constituency from first-term NDP MLA David Eggen, in a very tight race edging Eggen out by 178 votes. Elniski is the fourth MLA to represent Edmonton-Calder, a working class riding, in the last four election cycles.

Elniski would retire from politics prior to the 2012 Alberta general election.

Political Controversy

In June 2009, Elniski's political career hit a bump in the road when imprudent comments he had posted on the internet site Twitter made national headlines. Opposition parties referred to his online posts regarding women as sexist and offensive.

Elniski was lucky not to draw the ire of Premier Ed Stelmach who was already trying to quell controversy over ignorant comments made by other party MLAs.

2008 general election

Personal life

Despite being 6'7" and the tallest member of the Alberta Legislature, Elniski used to drive a Daimler AG Smart GmbH, or smart car. He has recently traded it in for a full-sized truck.

References

Living people
Politicians from Edmonton
Progressive Conservative Association of Alberta MLAs
Year of birth missing (living people)
21st-century Canadian politicians